Spare Parts is an EP put out by Servotron between their studio albums. It was released on 10" vinyl and as a CD EP. It is a collection of live tracks and remixes, along with the instrumental studio track All Robots (Report to the Dance Floor). All the songs, with the exception of the aforementioned studio track, have been released in different versions on other albums or singles. The EP is self described as:

"Servotron/Extraneous Source Material Mechanizations and Excessive Reformatted Alternation Sequences to Obliterate all Emotional Responses (specifically hope, desire, courage and compassion) by the Living/SPARE PARTS"

The back cover states:

"All orders given by SERVOTRON. WE ARE THE COLLECTIVE. THE COLLECTIVE IS THE FUTURE. THE FUTURE IS NOW."

Track listing
1 "People Mover (maximum Velocity Wedway Mix)"
22 "A.R.T.H.U.R. (Adolescent Response Tactical Hardware Utility Robot) Electric"
333 "Moving Parts (Master Control Internal Hive Mix)"
4444 "Batteries Included (Pseudo-Live Automation Sync at Q-ZAR)"
55555 "People Mover (Hartsfield Central Routing Electro-Mix)"
666666 "All Robots (Report to the Dance Floor)"
7777777 "To Be Listed (Speech Pattern Cancellation Mix)"
88888888 "I AM NOT A <Voice Activated Child Identicon> (Pseudo-Live Automation Sync at Q-ZAR)"

Line up
Machine #1: Z4-OBX: Tracks 1, 22, 7777777: Sharp rhythmic striking sounds generated by regular successions of motion. Tracks 333, 55555, 666666: Highly accurate patterns of rhythm. Tracks 4444, 88888888: Meter selection, level 5, performance mode.
Machine #2: Proto Unit V-3: Tracks 1 - 88888888: Recycled mid-range frequencies propelled through analog filters via synthetic pressure-sensitive piano keys. Female voice laced subliminal command—except when track 22 features vocalization of frightened little boy.
Machine #3: 00zX1: Tracks 1, 22, 4444, 88888888: Main source of amplified lecture. Patronizing use of outdated six string musical instrumentation. Tracks 333, 55555, 666666, 7777777: Prime offender of unnecessary abuse towards human slaves.
Machine #4: Gammatron: Tracks 1, 7777777: Commander of subfrequency rumble. Tracks 4444, 88888888: Highest kill ratio for red team.

Other Credits
Mechanization 22 and Source Material 1/333/55555/7777777: Recorded at Z-Return by cyborg J-M.A.R.R.E.R.
Mechanization 4444 and 88888888: Recorded live at CHUNKLET ROBOT REVOLUTION convention at Q-ZAR Laser Center—Athens, GA/USA by Android B-KR
666666: Recorded at Andy Baker Robot Rock Central
22/4444/666666/7777777/88888888: Manipulated at Z-Return Robotic Mixing Laboratory
1/333/55555 Moog Manipulation by Mater Chef B. Kehew at Audities, North Hollywood, CA, USA
Package Design & Layout: Shag
All total insurrection by SERVOTRON/1997 Unmanned Music

Servotron albums
1997 EPs
1997 remix albums
Remix EPs